The Shaw House, also known as the Shaw House Inn, is a historic Carpenter Gothic Victorian style house located at 703 Main Street in Ferndale, Humboldt County, California. It served historically as a courthouse, a post office, and a single-family dwelling.

History
The Shaw House was built in 1854 by Seth Shaw, who with his brother Stephen W. Shaw had arrived by canoe in 1852 to build a cabin, clear some land, claim it and found the town of Ferndale. Despite long-standing local legend, the house was not inspired by Nathaniel Hawthorne's House of the Seven Gables, but rather by the home of Mariano Guadalupe Vallejo in Sonoma, California which had been drawn and painted by Stephen W. Shaw. In the early days, the Shaw House served as the area's first courthouse as well as post office.

The building was owned by the family, vacant for several years at the end, until sold in 1967.  Fully restored by two owners, the Shaw House was added to the National Register of Historic Places on September 13, 1984.

It remains the oldest house in Ferndale and functions as a bed and breakfast under the Shaw House Inn name. It still features the marble fireplace that Isabella Shaw, Seth's bride, chose from Gump's department store in San Francisco.

References

External links
 Shaw House Inn website
 
 

Carpenter Gothic architecture in California
Victorian architecture in California
Houses on the National Register of Historic Places in California
Buildings and structures in Ferndale, California
Houses in Humboldt County, California
Carpenter Gothic houses in the United States
National Register of Historic Places in Humboldt County, California
1854 establishments in California
Houses completed in 1854